The Evening Post (8 February 1865 – 6 July 2002) was an afternoon metropolitan daily newspaper based in Wellington, New Zealand. It was founded in 1865 by Dublin-born printer, newspaper manager and leader-writer Henry Blundell, who brought his large family to New Zealand in 1863.

With his partner from what proved to be a false-start at Havelock, David Curle, who left the partnership that July, Henry and his three sons printed with a hand-operated press and distributed Wellington's first daily newspaper, The Evening Post, on 8 February 1865. Operating from 1894 as Blundell Bros Limited, his sons and their descendants continued the very successful business which dominated its circulation area.

While The Evening Post was remarkable in not suffering the rapid circulation decline of evening newspapers elsewhere it was decided in 1972 to merge ownership with that of the never-as-successful politically conservative morning paper, The Dominion, which belonged to listed Wellington Publishing Company Limited, within a new holding company — Independent Newspapers Limited.

Wellington Publishing Company Limited was, in 1964, one of the first parts of Rupert Murdoch's international empire, later News Corporation.

The last Post
The Evening Posts last publication was on the afternoon of 6 July 2002 and the next day the morning-published sister-publication, The Dominion, displayed its new name—The Dominion Post.

At the end of June 2003, Murdoch's publishing business was sold to Australia-based Fairfax and the proceeds invested in New Zealand's Sky Network Television Limited.

The Fairfax group continues to publish The Dominion Post.

References

Newspapers published in New Zealand
Publications established in 1865
Defunct newspapers published in New Zealand
Evening newspapers
Mass media in Wellington
1865 establishments in New Zealand
2002 disestablishments in New Zealand
Publications disestablished in 2002